Prince Nikolai Petrovitch Troubetzkoy (1828–1900) was a Privy Counsellor and Chamberlain of the Russian Imperial Court. A relative of the Decembrist Prince Sergei Petrovich Troubetzkoy, he served as the President of the Moscow branch of the Russian Musical Society. For many years, he was a close aide of the composer Nikolai Rubinstein.

In 1866, Troubetzkoy and Rubinstein created and founded the Moscow Conservatory.

In 1876, Troubetzkoy retired from the Directorate due to his appointment as Vice-Governor of Kaluga. He was elected an honorary member of the Moscow branch and in that position, he was approved by the Chairman of the Russian Musical Society Grand Duke Konstantin Nikolaevich Romanov.

He owned the famous Akhtyrka estate near Moscow. It was built in the Moscow Empire style and finished in 1825. Rubinstein and Conservatory professors were frequent visitors and often practiced there. Pyotr Ilyich Tchaikovsky visited in 1867. Wasily Kandinsky and brothers Viktor and Apollinary Vasnetsov often painted the estate.

Family 
Father — Prince Petr Ivanovitch Troubetzkoy
Mother — Princess Emilia Petrovna von Sayn-Wittgenstein-Berleburg (1801–1869), daughter of Field Marshal Prince Ludovic-Adolph Peter von Sayn-Wittgenstein-Berleburg
Nephew — Paolo Troubetzkoy
First wife — Countess Liubov Vassilievna Orlova-Denisova 1828-1860 (2 sons, 2 daughters)
Second wife — Sophia Alekseievna Lopouchina 1841-1901 (3 sons, 7 daughters)
Son – Evgenii Nikolaevitch Troubetzkoy (1863-1920)

References 
 Troubetzkoi, S. G. Les Princes Troubetzkoi, Labelle, Quebec, 1976. In Russian and French.
 Ferrand, Jacques, Troubetzkoy, S. G, Troubetzkoy, P. W, Tolstoy, W. M. Recueil genealogique et photographique de la descendance du prince Nicolas Petrovitch Troubetzkoy (1828-1900), Paris 1984. In French.
 Troubetzkoy, S. G, Bouteneff, S, Troubetzkoy, A. S. Our Family’s Album: A Genealogical and Photographic Chronicle of the Descendants of Prince Nikolai Petrovitch Troubetzkoy (1828-1900), New York, 1995. In English.
 Bouteneff, S, Our Family’s Album: A Genealogical and Pictographic Chronicle of the Descendants of Nikolai Petrovitch Troubetzkoy, New York, 2005.
 Troubetzkaya, E. E, Skazanie o rode Kniazei Troubetzkikh,  Moscow, 1891. 
 Pyotr Vladimirovich Dolgorukov, Rossiskaya Rodoslovnaya Kniga St. Petersburg, 1854. Vol. 1, pps. 319-330 
 Troubetzkoy, S. E, Minuvshee, YMCA Press, Paris, 1989. In Russian. 
 Troubetzkoy, S. E, Bygone Years: Minuvsheye, USA, 2004. English translation.
 Troubetzkoy, E. N, Iz Proshlago, Oriental Research Partners, 1976. In Russian.
 Revue des Deux Mondes - 1860 - tome 29, pps. 1006-1010

External links 
 abrikosov-sons.ru 
 ru.rodovid.org 
 sergiev.ru 
 rmusician.ru 
 rulex.ru 

1828 births
1900 deaths
People from Sergiyevo-Posadsky District
People from Dmitrovsky Uyezd (Moscow Governorate)
Russian princes